John Patterson (February 10, 1771 – February 7, 1848) was a member of the U.S. House of Representatives from Ohio for one term from 1823 to 1825.

Biography 
John Patterson (half brother of Pennsylvania congressman Thomas Patterson) was born in Little Britain Township in the Province of Pennsylvania.  He moved with his parents to Pattersons Mills, Pennsylvania, Cross Creek Township, Pennsylvania, in 1778.  He attended the common schools, and moved to St. Clairsville, Ohio.  He engaged in mercantile pursuits and served as the first mayor of St. Clairsville in 1807 and 1808.  He was a member of the Ohio House of Representatives in 1807 and 1808.  He served in the Ohio State Senate from 1815 to 1818.  He was associate judge of the court of common pleas of Belmont County, Ohio, from February 1810 to February 1815. Ohio Presidential elector in 1816 for James Monroe. He was elected as an Adams-Clay Republican to the Eighteenth Congress.  He was engaged in the hardware business and in agricultural pursuits.

Death
He died in St. Clairsville in 1848.  Interment in Union Cemetery.

Sources

The Political Graveyard

1771 births
1848 deaths
Members of the Ohio House of Representatives
Ohio state senators
People from Lancaster County, Pennsylvania
People from St. Clairsville, Ohio
1816 United States presidential electors
Democratic-Republican Party members of the United States House of Representatives from Ohio